Candlelight Records is a British record label based in London, England, founded by former Extreme Noise Terror bass guitarist Lee Barrett in 1993. The record label originally specialized in black metal, but quickly expanded to various other forms of heavy metal, extreme metal and hard rock, including death metal and melodic death metal, thrash metal, symphonic metal, metalcore, gothic rock, post-rock and post-metal. Some of the company's flagship bands include Emperor, 1349, Blut Aus Nord, Ihsahn, Opeth, Christian Death, Orange Goblin, Winterfylleth, Zyklon, Abigail Williams, Insomnium, Havok, Obituary, Nachtmystium and Limbonic Art.

In January 2001, Candlelight Records launched an American division, Candlelight Records USA, which is headquartered in Schwenksville, Pennsylvania, and is administered by Paula Hogan. In 2002, Barrett sold Candlelight Records to Edward Christie and Steve Beatty, and went on to form the Earache Records imprint Elitist Records (which only lasted three years, folding in 2005). In 2004, the company setup a licensing deal with Back on Black Records (also owned by Beatty) to release its titles on vinyl in the United Kingdom, and later (in 2006), in North America. 

In December 2003, Candlelight Records USA signed a licensing deal to handle the North American manufacturing, distribution and sales of Dutch record label Karmageddon Media. Similar licensing and distribution agreements were later signed with American record label Arctic Music Group in February 2004, Norwegian record label Tabu Recordings in March 2004, Swedish record label Threeman Recordings in April 2004, English record label Rise Above Records and French record label Appease Me Records (owned by members of Blut Aus Nord), both in November 2004, Swedish record label Regain Records in February 2005, Norwegian record label Nocturnal Art Productions (for worldwide distribution) in May 2005, German record label AFM Records in June 2005, and American record label Willowtip Records (for European distribution) in August 2007. 

In January 2016, Christie and Beatty sold Candlelight Records' assets to Finnish company Spinefarm Music Group (which also houses Spinefarm Records, Spikefarm Records and Snakefarm Records), which itself has been owned by Universal Music Group since 2002. As such, Candlelight Records became an affiliate of Universal Music Group, and has since been managed by Spinefarm Records' Dante Bonutto. In December 2022, Universal Music Group announced that all Spinefarm Music Group record labels would be distributed worldwide by PIAS Group, starting January 2023.

Artists

Candlelight UK 

1349
Abaddon Incarnate
Abduction
Abigail Williams
The Atlas Moth
Age of Silence
Anaal Nathrakh
Averse Sefira
Blut Aus Nord
Burning the Oppressor
Carnal Forge 
Crionics
Crowbar
Dam
Daylight Dies 
Defiance 
Emperor
Epoch of Unlight 
Forest Stream
Grimfist 
Ihsahn 
Illdisposed 
Imperial Vengeance 
Insomnium 
Kaamos 
Lost Eden 
Manes 
Myrkskog 
Nebelhexe 
Novembers Doom 
Nuclear 
Octavia Sperati 
October File 
Omnium Gatherum 
Onslaught 
Pantheon I 
PSOTY
Sear Bliss 
Saturnian Mist 
Savage Messiah 
Sigh 
Starkweather 
Stonegard 
Subterranean Masquerade 
Thine Eyes Bleed 
To-Mera 
Voices 
Whitechapel 
Winterfylleth 
Wodensthrone 
Wolverine 
Xerath 
Zyklon

Candlelight USA 

See for Candlelight UK, but also:
Absu
Aeternus
Amoral
Audrey Horne
Bal-Sagoth
Battered
Bronx Casket Co.
Candlemass
Centinex
Dark Funeral
Demonic Resurrection
Destruction
Dismember
Electric Wizard
Elvenking
Attila Csihar)
Enslaved
Entombed
Fear Factory (2009-2012)
Firebird
Gorgoroth
Grand Magus
Havok
Hevein
Jorn
Keep of Kalessin
Khold
Kotipelto
Krieg
Lord Belial
Marduk
Masterplan
Morbid Angel
Necrophobic
Obituary
Odious Mortem
Opeth
Overmars
Pro-Pain
The Project Hate MCMXCIX
Ram-Zet
Rob Rock
Sahg
Sarah Jezebel Deva
Satariel
SCUM
Setherial
Seven Witches
Shakra
sHEAVY
Sothis
Sinister
Sourvein
Spektr
Susperia
Taint
Theatre of Tragedy
Thyrane
Thyrfing
Time Requiem
U.D.O.
Vader
Vision of Disorder
Vreid
Windir
Witchcraft

See also
 List of record labels

References

External links 
 
 
 
 

1993 establishments in England
American record labels
Black metal record labels
British companies established in 1993
British record labels
Candlelight Records
Death metal record labels
English record labels
Labels distributed by Universal Music Group
Record labels established in 1993